Cartland is a village in South Lanarkshire, Scotland.

See also
List of places in South Lanarkshire

Villages in South Lanarkshire